Toumodi Department is a department of Bélier Region in Lacs District, Ivory Coast. In 2021, its population was 168,363 and its seat is the settlement of Toumodi. The sub-prefectures of the department are Angoda, Kokumbo, Kpouèbo, and Toumodi.

History

Toumodi Department was created in 1988 as a first-level subdivision via a split-off from Bouaké Department.

In 1997, regions were introduced as new first-level subdivisions of Ivory Coast; as a result, all departments were converted into second-level subdivisions. Toumodi Department was included in Lacs Region.

In 2011, districts were introduced as new first-level subdivisions of Ivory Coast. At the same time, regions were reorganised and became second-level subdivisions and all departments were converted into third-level subdivisions. At this time, Toumodi Department became part of Bélier Region in Lacs District.

In 2012, two sub-prefectures were split from Toumodi Department to create Djékanou Department.

Notes

Departments of Bélier
1988 establishments in Ivory Coast
States and territories established in 1988